The San Gabriel Fault is a geological fault in Los Angeles County, California, running about  southeastward from the Ridge Basin in the Sierra Pelona-San Emigdio Mountains juncture area to the western San Gabriel Mountains that forms their southwestern face near Sunland and the northeastern San Fernando Valley, and then on the south flank to the southeastern part of the San Gabriel range.

Geology
The San Gabriel Fault is a right-lateral strike-slip that was last active thousands of years ago — Late Quaternary west of intersection with the Sierra Madre Fault, and Quaternary east of that intersection, and Holocene only further west between Saugus and Castaic-Gorman.

The San Gabriel Fault was once part of the San Andreas Fault, and is believed to be the former path of it. It is also believed that the northwestern end of this fault zone meets the current San Andreas Fault zone beneath the Frazier Mountain Thrust, near the juncture of the San Andreas with the Garlock Fault and Big Pine Fault. The San Gabriel Fault moves at a rate of between 1 and 5 millimeters a year, with an average slip of around 3 millimeters.

References

External links
San Gabriel Fault – USGS
San Gabriel Fault Zone – Southern California Earthquake Data Center
Geoscienceworld.org: San Gabriel Fault

Seismic faults of California
San Gabriel Mountains
Strike-slip faults
Geology of Los Angeles County, California
Geography of the San Fernando Valley
Natural history of Los Angeles County, California